Murcia Cobras is an American football team based in Murcia, Region of Murcia (Spain).

History
The team was officially established in 1994. They played regional competitions for two years before joining the first season of the new Spanish national league in 1997, being included in the Second Division of the competition.

Michael Bangel was signed as the first Pro American Import player and helped lead the organization to National Championships. The Cobras have since brought in many import players.

In 2016, Cobras became champion of the Serie B and promoted to the Serie A, the top Spanish league.

External links 
Official website

American football teams in Spain
Sport in Murcia
American football teams established in 1994
1994 establishments in Spain
Sports teams in the Region of Murcia